Jejeti is a town in the Atiwa East of the Eastern Region of Ghana.

References

Populated places in the Eastern Region (Ghana)